WFFR-LP (100.9 FM) is a radio station licensed to serve the community of Roosevelt Park, Michigan. The station is owned by Shoreline Broadcasting, Inc. It airs a classic hits format.

The station was assigned the WFFR-LP call letters by the Federal Communications Commission on April 9, 2014.

References

External links
Official Website

FFR-LP
FFR-LP
Radio stations established in 2014
2014 establishments in Michigan
Classic hits radio stations in the United States
Muskegon County, Michigan